This article details the qualifying phase for swimming at the 2024 Summer Olympics. 852 swimmers will compete in thirty-five swimming pool events at the Games, with forty-four more racing through the 10-kilometre open water marathon. The qualification window for swimming pool events will occur between 1 March 2023 and 23 June 2024.

Qualification summary 
A National Olympic Committee (NOC) may enter a maximum of two qualified athletes in each individual event, but only if both of them have attained the Olympic Qualifying Time (OQT). One athlete per event can potentially enter if they meet the Olympic Consideration Time (OCT), or if the total quota of 852 athletes has not been targeted. NOCs may also permit swimmers regardless of time (one per gender) under a Universality place since they have no swimmers attaining either of the standard entry times (OQT/OCT).

For the relays, a maximum of 16 qualifying teams in each event must be permitted to accumulate a total of 112 relay teams; each NOC may enter only one team. The top three teams in each relay race at the 2023 World Aquatics Championships in Fukuoka, Japan will directly book a slot for their corresponding event at the Olympics, while the remaining thirteen vying for qualification per relay race must attain their best time from the heats and finals at the combined 2023 and 2024 meet in Doha.

NOCs without a swimmer attaining the OQT or invited by World Aquatics through OCT may enter the highest-ranked male and female swimmer based on the Points Table (2024 edition) or one man and one woman if they participate at the 2023 or 2024 World Championships. Similar to the 2020 format, swimmers from NOCs who have achieved the OCT allocated to the universality place may compete in a maximum of two individual pool events, while those without the OQT and OCT are limited to enter only one individual pool event.

Following the end of the qualification window, FINA will assess the number of swimmers who have achieved the OQT, the number of relay-only swimmers, and the number of Universality places, before inviting those with OCT to fulfill the total quota of 852. Additionally, OCT places will be distributed by event according to the position of the World Aquatics Rankings during the qualifying deadline.

Time standards
The qualifying time standards must be obtained at the 2023 and 2024 World Championships, continental championships, continental swimming meets, national championships and selection trials, and various international meets approved by World Aquatics in the period between 1 March 2023 and 23 June 2024.

The following table outlines the qualifying time standards for Paris 2024:

* OQTs correspond to the time achieved by a fourteenth-place swimmer in his or her respective preliminary heat of each event at the previous Games.
ª Because the fourteenth-place swimmer achieved a standard slower than the OQT in Tokyo 2020, the OQT used at the previous Games will remain constant.
^ OCTs are derived by adding 0.5% of the OQT standard.

Individual events 
Those who have achieved the Olympic Qualifying Time (OQT) or the Olympic Consideration Time (OCT), or have received a Universality place are listed below for each of the following individual events.

Men's individual events

Men's 50 m freestyle

Men's 100 m freestyle

Men's 200 m freestyle

Men's 400 m freestyle

Men's 800 m freestyle

Men's 1500 m freestyle

Men's 100 m backstroke

Men's 200 m backstroke

Men's 100 m breaststroke

Men's 200 m breaststroke

Men's 100 m butterfly

Men's 200 m butterfly

Men's 200 m individual medley

Men's 400 m individual medley

Women's individual events

Women's 50 m freestyle

Women's 100 m freestyle

Women's 200 m freestyle

Women's 400 m freestyle

Women's 800 m freestyle

Women's 1500 m freestyle

Women's 100 m backstroke

Women's 200 m backstroke

Women's 100 m breaststroke

Women's 200 m breaststroke

Women's 100 m butterfly

Women's 200 m butterfly

Women's 200 m individual medley

Women's 400 m individual medley

Relay events
Teams are qualified by one of the following routes:
 The top three teams in each relay race at the 2023 FINA World Championships (scheduled for July 14 to 30 in Fukuoka, Japan), will enter the corresponding event in Paris 2024 based on the results achieved in the finals.
 The remaining thirteen teams vying for qualification with the fastest times from the heats and finals of both the 2023 and 2024 FINA World Championships (scheduled for February 2 to 18 in Doha, Qatar) will enter the corresponding event in Paris 2024.

Timeline

Men's  freestyle relay

Men's  freestyle relay

Men's  medley relay

Women's  freestyle relay

Women's  freestyle relay

Women's  medley relay

Mixed  medley relay

Open water events 
The men's and women's 10 km races featured 22 swimmers each, three less than those in the Tokyo 2020 roster:
 3: the three medalists in the 10 km races at the 2023 World Aquatics Championships in Fukuoka, Japan
 13: the top thirteen swimmers vying for qualification at the 2024 World Aquatics Championships in Doha, Qatar
 5: one representative from each FINA continent (Africa, the Americas, Asia, Europe, and Oceania).
 1: from the host nation (France) if not qualified by other means. If one or more French open water swimmers qualify regularly and directly, their slots will be reallocated to the next highest-ranked eligible swimmers from the 2024 World Aquatics Championships.

Timeline

Men's 10 km open water 

° Unused host quota place
^ Unused continental quota place

Women's 10 km open water 

° Unused host quota place
^ Unused continental quota place

Notes

References

2020
Qualification for the 2024 Summer Olympics